Kronsberg is a hill about six kilometres in length and dominates the surrounding areas up to 30 meters, just outside Hanover. The highest point on the Kronsberg is the scenic hill with 118 meters (387 ft). It mainly consists of marl.

Expo-settlement Kronsberg
The Expo-settlement Kronsberg is a district of Kirchrode-Bemerode-Wülferode in Hanover and has approximately 7,300 residents (2013). The district emerged in the late 1990s in connection with the EXPO 2000 event. People live in 2,600 apartments, 150 condominiums and about 400 private townhouses, as well as semi-detached and detached houses. There are two neighbourhood parks and meeting places for all age groups. The front gardens and the courtyards of the individual building blocks are varied and diversified in order to achieve above-average housing quality. There is an extensive infrastructure facilities with schools, kindergartens, shops, the community center Krokus and the Evangelical Church Centre Kronsberg available. The project is showcased in the Crystal exhibition pavilion in London as a global standard for integrated construction. The World Cities Summit 2012 in Singapore also paid tribute to the residential  area as one of the world's hundred most innovative infrastructure projects.

Literature 
 Hermann Löns: Hinter dem Kronsberg, 1904
 Hermann Löns: Auf dem Kronsberge, 1904

Links

References

Geography of Hanover
Expo 2000
Mountains and hills of Lower Saxony